Hoodie SZN (SZN pronounced "season") is the second studio album by American rapper A Boogie wit da Hoodie. It was released on December 21, 2018. 
Features included      Juice WRLD, 6ix9ine, Nav, Offset, Tyga, Young Thug, and Queen Naija, among others. The track "Odee" had originally been made available online on March 23, 2018. The track "Pull Up" was previously included on the EP International Artist. The album was preceded by single "Look Back at It".

Background
On December 3, 2018, A Boogie released the album's artwork to his Instagram page. The artwork was described by XXL Mag as "rhymer, cloaked in darkness, in the soaking rain wearing a Highbridge the Label hoodie with the actual Bronx High Bridge in the background". In December 2018, A Boogie said that the album's recording process took over a year to complete.

On social media, A Boogie posted that "My Sophomore Album #HoodieSzn drops 12/21/18... It took me over a year to complete and I can’t wait for you all to hear it. This is for my Day 1’s. Thank You for riding with me."

Singles
Four songs from Hoodie SZN charted on the US Billboard Hot 100, 'Demons and Angels' featuring Juice WRLD peaked at number 90, 'Startender'  featuring Offset and Tyga peaked at number 59, 6ix9ine's assisted track, "Swervin", peaked at number 38 and "Look Back At It" (the album's lead single) peaked at number 27, becoming the highest-charting song from the album and A Boogie's highest charting song overall at that point.

Critical reception

Hoodie SZN was released to a generally positive reception from music critics.

Commercial performance
Hoodie SZN debuted at number two on the US Billboard 200 with 90,000 album-equivalent units (including 6,000 pure album sales) in its first week. In its second week, the album remained at number two on the chart, earning an additional 58,000 units. In its third week, the album climbed to number one on the chart, earning 58,000 more units with 823 copies in traditional album sales. This became A Boogie wit da Hoodie's first US number-one album. In its fourth week, the album remained at number one for a second week, moving 56,000 units with 749 in traditional album sales, making it the lowest-selling number-one album since Billboard began using Nielsen SoundScan to track unit sales. On June 26, 2019, the album was certified platinum by the Recording Industry Association of America (RIAA) for combined sales and album-equivalent units of over a million units in the United States.

Track listing
Credits adapted from Tidal.

Notes
  signifies an additional producer
"Look Back at It" contains interpolations from songs performed by Michael Jackson:
 "Remember The Time", written by Michael Jackson, Teddy Riley and Bernard Belle.
"You Rock My World", written by Michael Jackson, Rodney Jerkins. 
XXXTentacion adds vocals on Uptown / Bustdown

Personnel
Credits adapted from Tidal.

 AJ Ruined My Record – recording , mixing 
 Christian QC Quinonez – recording 
 Sauce Miyagi – recording 
 Jacob Richards – mixing 
 Jaycen Joshua – mixing 
 Mike Seaberg – mixing 
 Mono Beats - mastering 
 Rashawn McLean – mixing 
 Juan Mowezz Montero – mixing 
 Alex Tumay – mixing 
 Chris Athens – mastering 
 Jahaan Sweet – engineering 
 Hitmaka – additional arrangement

Charts

Weekly charts

Year-end charts

Decade-end charts

Certifications

See also
 List of Billboard 200 number-one albums of 2019
 List of Billboard number-one R&B/hip-hop albums of 2019
 List of number-one albums of 2019 (Canada)

References

2018 albums
A Boogie wit da Hoodie albums
Atlantic Records albums
Albums recorded at Noble Street Studios
Albums produced by Hitmaka
Albums produced by London on da Track
Albums produced by T-Minus (record producer)
Albums produced by Jake One
Albums produced by Kenny Beats